is a Japanese architect, born in Kyoto. He graduated from  Kyoto University and worked for Tadao Ando and Associates. He founded his own architectural firm, Takashi Yamaguchi & Associates, in 1996. Yamaguchi served as a visiting professor at the Osaka University of Arts in 2005, and in 2009 served as visiting professor at Columbia University and visiting scholar at Harvard. He is a professor at Osaka Sangyo University and a member of the Japan Institute of Architects and the Architectural Institute of Japan. He is an elite member of the Supporters of Romania Research at the Academy of Romanian Scientists. He is also a Regional President of Asia Designer Communication Platform.

Biography 
In 1988 Yamaguchi was a founding member of ARX, an international research group for theory and practice of architecture which has offices in New York, Geneva, Berlin, and Lisbon. The group includes staff from the offices of Peter Eisenman and Daniel Libeskind, as well as theorists from Columbia University. He founded Takashi Yamaguchi & Associates in 1996, and served as a visiting scholar at  Harvard University in 2010.

Works 

1998: Glass Temple, Kyoto
2000: White Temple, Kyoto
2004: Metal Office, Kyoto
2008: Silent Office, Tokyo
2009: Breathing Factory, Osaka
2010: House in Ise, Mie Prefecture
2011: Parametric Fragment, Mie Prefecture
2012: Koshimo Plus, Hyōgo Prefecture

Awards 
1992: Finalist of Spreebogen International Competition for a New German Capital in Berlin with "ARX", Germany
1999: Asakura Prize, The 18th Space Design Review, Japan
2001: 1st place, the 9th DuPont Benedictus Awards, United States
2005: Good Design Award, Japan
2005: Barbara Cappochin Architecture Prize, Italy
2005: Finalist of JIA Architectural Awards, Japan
2005: JIA Architectural Awards Selection, Japan
2007: Intermedia-globe Silver Prize, World Media Festival, Germany
2008: Good Design Award, Japan
2009: Good Design Award, Japan
2011: The Kyoto Design Award, Japan
2011: Selected Dedalo Minosse International Prize, Italy

Exhibitions 
1998: Exhibition, Glass Temple, Japan
1999: The 18th Space Design Review, Japan
2000: Exhibition, Eindhoven University of Technology, Netherlands
2001: Exhibition, University of Art and Design Helsinki, Finland
2002: CAS: Contemporary Art and Spirits, Japan
2004: Designer's Week Exhibition, Japan
2004: International Architectural Biennale in Beijing, China
2004: Liquid Stone: New Architecture in Concrete, National Building Museum, United States
2005: International Biennal Barbara Cappochin Exhibition, Padua, Italy
2005: Good Design Award Presentation, Japan
2005: AD 5 ans Exposition, Bibliothèque nationale de France, Paris, France
2006: Salzburg Reinberg International Competition, Austria
2007: Exhibition, Eion Mincu University of Architecture and Urbanism, Romania
2007: Parallel Nippon – Contemporary Japanese Architecture – 1996–2006, Tokyo Metropolitan Museum of Photography
2008: Good Design Award Exhibition, Japan
2009: Good Design Award Exhibition, Japan
2009: arquitectura japonesa desde miradas argentinas, Argentina
2010: Contemplating the Void: Interventions in the Guggenheim Museum Rotunda, Guggenheim Museum, New York
2010: Barbara Cappochin International Biennale in Japan, Institution of Italian Culture, Japan
2011: Dedalo Minosse International Prize Exhibition, Italy
2011: The Kyoto Design Award Exhibition, Japan
2012: GA Houses Projects 2012 Exhibition, Japan
2012: Vertical Urban Factory: East Asia Exhibition, New York University's Department of East Asian Studies, New York

References

External links
Takashi Yamaguchi and Associates

1953 births
Living people
Columbia University faculty
Kyoto University alumni
Japanese architects